Arlo (Budgie) Bugeja (born 18 March 1986 in Humbug Scrub, Adelaide, South Australia) is a former motorcycle speedway rider from Australia.

Career
Starting with Gillman Speedway he moved to the UK to mechanic for Glasgow Tigers' Lee Smethills, before getting his Premier League  break with Redcar Bears.

Bugeja began his UK career at the Redcar Bears in the Premier League in 2007. He stood in for the injured Daniel Giffard for 10 matches. Giffard returned and he joined Berwick Bandits for the remainder of the season. He returned to Redcar for the 2008 season only missing 3 weeks due to a broken wrist. He continued with Redcar the following season but in 2010 he signed on loan for the Sheffield Tigers and the Edinburgh Monarchs. Left without a club for 2011 he was signed for Redcar Cubs as he waited for a return to the Premier League. Bugeja is currently married to a South Australian teacher, Claire Bugeja.

References 

1986 births
Living people
Australian speedway riders
Redcar Bears riders
Berwick Bandits riders
Sheffield Tigers riders
Edinburgh Monarchs riders